Richard Boyle, FRS (died 3 June 1665) was an Irish politician who was Member of Parliament for County Cork from 1661 until his death in action. 

Boyle was the son of Richard Boyle, 2nd Earl of Cork and brother of Charles Boyle, 3rd Viscount Dungarvan. He was educated at Christ Church, Oxford.

He was elected an Original Fellow of the Royal Society in 1663. A naval volunteer during the Second Anglo-Dutch War, Boyle was killed in action in Southwold Bay at the Battle of Lowestoft.

References 

 

1665 deaths
Alumni of Christ Church, Oxford
Original Fellows of the Royal Society

Year of birth unknown
Richard
Royal Navy personnel of the Second Anglo-Dutch War
Members of the Parliament of Ireland (pre-1801) for County Cork constituencies
Irish MPs 1661–1666
Younger sons of earls
English military personnel killed in action